Johnny Wilson was born Giovanni Francesco Panica on March 23, 1893 in Harlem, New York City.  He was a professional boxer who fought from 1911 until 1926. The highlight of Wilson's career came when he captured the world middleweight championship by defeating Mike O'Dowd by decision over 12 rounds on May 6, 1920. Wilson held the crown until he was outpointed over 15 rounds by the all-time great Harry Greb.

After retiring from the ring, Wilson was involved in the ownership/management of several successful nightclubs in New York and Boston. Wilson died on December 8, 1985.

Cameo 
In 1970 Wilson had a short appearing in Michelangelo Antonioni's Zabriskie Point movie (at 00:42' in Italian edition), when he was 77.

Professional boxing record
All information in this section is derived from BoxRec, unless otherwise stated.

Official record

All newspaper decisions are officially regarded as “no decision” bouts and are not counted in the win/loss/draw column.

Unofficial record

Record with the inclusion of newspaper decisions in the win/loss/draw column.

See also
List of middleweight boxing champions

References

External links
Cyber Boxing Zone
Harry Greb site
 

1893 births
1985 deaths
People from Harlem
Middleweight boxers
American people of Italian descent
American male boxers